An Almain rivet is a type of flexible plate armour created in Germany in about 1500. It was designed to be manufactured easily whilst still affording considerable protection to the wearer. It consisted of a breastplate and backplate with laminated thigh-guards called tassets.
Almain rivets were generally of fairly low quality, but they were cheap: a royal proclamation issued by Henry VIII in 1542 designated them at 7s 6d, which equated to one sixth of the cost of a suit of demi-lance armor.  
Almain rivets were frequently purchased en masse as munitions-grade armour to  equip royal armies or personal retinues.

Nomenclature
The term rivet derives from the "overlapping plates sliding on rivets" characteristic of this type of armour. Almain is an Early Modern English term for "German" (still used in some poetic and/or archaic senses), from the French alemanique, from the mediaeval Latin alemanicus, from Alemanni, an early Germanic tribe.
The term was introduced in about 1530 and remained in use until about 1600. Based on the term almain-rivet, the word rivet itself acquired a meaning of "armour", attested (rarely) during the mid-16th century.

See also
Greenwich armour
Swiss arms and armour

References 

 Cornish, Paul. Henry VIII's Army.  Oxford: Osprey Publishing, 1987. 
 Ffoulkes, Charles. The Armourer and his Craft. New York: Dover Publications, 1912.

External links
Jason Grimes, Landsknecht Pikeman Armour

Western plate armour